Bamaji Lake is a lake in the Albany River and James Bay drainage basins in Kenora District, Ontario, Canada located about  north of Sioux Lookout.

The primary inflow, from North Bamaji Lake, and outflow, to Roadhouse Lake, is the Cat River, which flows into Lake St. Joseph and then via the Albany River to James Bay. Secondary inflows are Bamaji Creek, the Brokenmouth River, and an outlet channel from Fry Lake.

The Slate Falls First Nation and associated Slate Falls Airport are just to the north on North Bamaji Lake.

See also
List of lakes in Ontario

References

Lakes of Kenora District